Tolchester Beach is an unincorporated community located on the eastern shore of the Chesapeake Bay in Kent County, Maryland, United States. Established in 1877, it was formerly a popular resort.
Tolchester Beach is located just north of Rock Hall. The resort was closed in 1962.

In the late 1800s, Tolchester Beach was a popular tourist destination for residents of Baltimore and other areas served by the Chesapeake Bay steamships.   The beach had hotels, restaurants, games, picnics, horse-racing, and an amusement park with a merry-go-round and a roller coaster.

Some of the steamships that served Tolchester Beach were the ''Emma Giles  and Louise.

See also
Tolchester, Maryland, census-designated place covering most of Tolchester Beach

References

External links

Tolchester Beach Revisited
SeaKayak Navigation List — Tolchester Beach
Station TCBM2 - 8573364 - Tolchester Beach, MD

Beaches of Maryland
Unincorporated communities in Maryland
Unincorporated communities in Kent County, Maryland
1877 establishments in Maryland
Maryland populated places on the Chesapeake Bay
Landforms of Kent County, Maryland